Huang Yuejin (born April 1953) is a prominent member of the Chinese Communist Party from Fengcheng, Liaoning. He has a bachelor's degree in Construction Materials from Tongji University.

Huang has held various positions within the Shanghai Party Branch, such as being the former deputy secretary and mayor of the Hongkou District. He was also the  deputy secretary general of the Shanghai Municipal Government (zh), under the Municipal Construction Committee and was the former city's Vice Chairman. Following his appointment into the CCP Shanghai Municipal Committee (zh) in May 2002, he was appointed as the Deputy Minister of the Central United Front Work Department in September 2003.  On 24 May 2012, Huang was transferred to Jiangxi Province as the CPPCC party secretary; and on 13 June during the 6th plenary session of the 10th CPPCC Jiangxi Provincial Committee, he was elected as the provincial CPPCC Chairman. It was in January 2018 when Huang was elected as a member of the 13th CPPCC National Committee.

References 

1953 births
Tongji University alumni
Living people
CPPCC Committee Chairmen of Jiangxi
Members of the 9th Chinese People's Political Consultative Conference
Delegates to the 11th National People's Congress
Members of the 10th Chinese People's Political Consultative Conference
People from Fengcheng, Liaoning